Oumar Koné (born 11 February 1985) is a Malian judoka. He competed for Mali at the 2012 Summer Olympics in the Men's 100 kg event but lost to Luciano Corrêa in the first round.

References

External links 
 

1985 births
Olympic judoka of Mali
Malian male judoka
Judoka at the 2012 Summer Olympics
Living people
21st-century Malian people